The 1966 Varto earthquake occurred on 19 August with a moment magnitude of 6.8 a maximum Mercalli intensity of IX (Violent). At least 2,394 were killed and up to 1,500 people were injured in the town of Varto in the Muş Province of eastern Turkey.

The earthquake devastated all the structures in Varto. This disaster was preceded by an earthquake of magnitude 5.6 that hit Varto on 7 March 1966 killing 14 and wounding 75 people.

See also 
 List of earthquakes in 1966
 List of earthquakes in Turkey
 North Anatolian Fault

References

External links 

1966 Varto
1966 in Turkey
1966 earthquakes
History of Muş Province
August 1966 events in Europe
1966 disasters in Turkey